The 2019 SaskTel Tankard, the provincial men's curling championship for Saskatchewan, was held from February 6 to 10 at the Whitewood Community Centre in Whitewood, Saskatchewan The winning Kirk Muyres team represented Saskatchewan at the 2019 Tim Hortons Brier in Brandon, Manitoba, Canada's national men's curling championship.

Whitewood is the smallest community to ever host the Tankard.

Teams
The teams are listed as follows:

Knockout Draw Brackets

A Event

B Event

C Event

Playoffs

A vs. B
February 9, 7:00pm

C1 vs. C2
February 9, 7:00pm

Semifinal
February 10, 9:30am

Final
February 10, 2:30pm

References

2019 Tim Hortons Brier
Curling in Saskatchewan
2019 in Saskatchewan
SaskTel Tankard
Whitewood, Saskatchewan